Charles Aznavour (1924-2018) was a French and Armenian singer, songwriter, actor, public activist and diplomat.

Aznavour or Aznavourian may also refer to:

Places
Charles Aznavour Square, Yerevan, Armenia
Charles Aznavour Square, Gyumri, Armenia
Aznavour Centre commonly known as the Charles Aznavour Museum, Aznavour Foundation's cultural project in Yerevan, Armenia

Music
Charles Aznavour (Il faut savoir), a 1961 album
Charles Aznavour (Je m'voyais déjà), a 1961 album
Aznavour 65, 1965 French studio album by Charles Aznavour

Sports
Aznavour FC or Aznavour Noyemberyan, a defunct Armenian football club from Noyemberyan, Armenia

Others with the given name or surname
Hovsep Aznavur (1854-1935), Ottoman Armenian architect
Karina Aznavourian (born 1974), Russian-Armenian épée fencer
Seda Aznavour (born 1947), French-Armenian female singer and artist, the daughter of Charles Aznavour